The 2016–17 Montana Grizzlies basketball team represented the University of Montana during the 2016–17 NCAA Division I men's basketball season. The Grizzlies, led by third-year head coach Travis DeCuire, played their home games at Dahlberg Arena in Missoula, Montana as members of the Big Sky Conference. They finished the season 16–16, 11–7 in Big Sky play to finish in a tie for fifth place. As the No. 5 seed in the Big Sky tournament, they lost to Idaho in the quarterfinals.

Previous season
The Grizzlies finished the 2015–16 season 21–12, 14–4 in Big Sky play to finish in second place. They defeated Sacramento State and Idaho to advance to the Championship game of the Big Sky tournament where they lost to Weber State. They were invited to the College Basketball Invitational where they lost in the first round to Nevada.

Offseason

Departures

Incoming transfers

2016 recruiting class

2017 recruiting class

Roster

Schedule and results

|-
!colspan=9 style=| Exhibition

|-
!colspan=9 style=| Non-conference regular season

|-
!colspan=9 style=| Big Sky regular season

|-
!colspan=9 style=| Big Sky tournament

See also
2016–17 Montana Lady Griz basketball team

References

Montana Grizzlies basketball seasons
Montana
Montana Grizzlies basketball
Montana Grizzlies basketball